Virgilio Rosario (1499 – 22 May 1559) was an Italian Roman Catholic bishop and cardinal.

Biography

Virgilio Rosario was born in Spoleto in 1499.  He became a doctor of both laws.  He was ordained as a priest and became rector of a parish.  He then moved to Rome, becoming a canon of Sancta Maria at Martyres (i.e. the Pantheon, which was consecrated as a church in 609 AD).

On 27 August 1554 he was elected during the papacy of Pope Julius III as Bishop of Ischia. He was consecrated as a bishop on 24 February 1555 in the Sistine Chapel by Cardinal Giovanni Michele Saraceni with Ascanio Ferrari, Bishop Emeritus of Montepeloso and Fabio Mirto Frangipani, Bishop of Caiazzo, serving as co-consecrators.

Pope Paul IV made him a cardinal priest in the consistory of 15 March 1557. He received the red hat and the titular church of San Simone Profeta on 24 March 1557.  He was named Vicar General of Rome perpetuo in 1558, holding this position until his death.  He was a member of the commission of four cardinals charged with judging the case of Cardinal Giovanni Morone.

He died suddenly in the Apostolic Palace in Rome on 22 May 1559.  He was buried in Santa Maria sopra Minerva.

References

External links and additional sources
 (for Chronology of Bishops) 
 (for Chronology of Bishops) 

1499 births
1559 deaths
16th-century Italian cardinals
Bishops appointed by Pope Julius III
People from Spoleto
16th-century Italian Roman Catholic bishops